Marku is a village in Achham District in the Seti Zone of western Nepal. At the time of the 1991 Nepal census the village had a population of 1855 living in 413 houses. At the time of the 2001 Nepal census, the population was 2058 of which 41% was literate. In Marku there is a most popular temple which called "Shri Shannikot Bajrayogini Maai"Now (2023 AD) Marku is a ward  of Chaurpati Rural Municipality . Pauwabazar , Birkhamma and Malikasthaan are the small market areas of Marku.

References

Populated places in Achham District
Village development committees in Achham District